Jorge Adán Cárdenas Estrada (born 21 April 1997) is a Mexican weightlifter. He competed in the men's 73 kg event at the 2020 Summer Olympics, where he placed 11th. Cárdenas sparked controversy during the opening ceremony as he removed his face mask to greet a television camera as he walked past it, which led to criticism on social media for allegedly violating the COVID-19 measures put in place for the Games.

References

External links
Jorge Cárdenas at Eurosport

1997 births
Living people
Mexican male weightlifters
Olympic weightlifters of Mexico
Weightlifters at the 2020 Summer Olympics
Pan American Games competitors for Mexico
Weightlifters at the 2019 Pan American Games
Pan American Weightlifting Championships medalists
Sportspeople from Culiacán
21st-century Mexican people